Jaime Alberto Castañeda Ortega (born 29 October 1986 in Chigorodó, Antioquia) is a Colombian professional road bicycle racer, who last rode for UCI Continental team .

Major results

2003
 National Junior Track Championships
1st  Madison
1st  Scratch
 7th Road race, Pan American Junior Road Championships
2006
 1st  Road race, National Under-23 Road Championships
2007
 1st Stage 4 Vuelta a los Santanderes
2008
 1st Stage 4 Vuelta a Colombia U23
 1st Stage 5 Clásica Ciudad de Girardot
2009
 1st Stage 3 Clásica Ciudad de Girardot
 1st Prologue Clasica Marinilla
 1st Stage 2 Clásico RCN
2010
 1st Overall Volta Ciclística Internacional do Rio Grande do Sul
 1st Stage 2 Vuelta a Colombia
 1st Stage 2 Vuelta a Cuba
2011
 Vuelta a la Independencia Nacional
1st Stages 7 & 8
 2nd Overall Tour do Rio
2013
 1st Stage 2 Clásico RCN
 3rd Vuelta al Mundo Maya
2014
 1st Stage 1 (TTT) Vuelta a Colombia
2015
 1st Stage 1 (TTT) Vuelta a Colombia
 4th Overall Vuelta a la Independencia Nacional
1st Points classification
1st Stages 2 & 6
2017
 1st Stage 9 Clásico RCN

References

External links 
Profile at Lampre-Fondital official website

1986 births
Living people
Colombian male cyclists
Sportspeople from Antioquia Department
21st-century Colombian people